The third season of the American reality talent show The Voice premiered on September 10, 2012 on NBC. NBC officially announced The Voice's renewal on May 13, 2012, during its 2012–13 upfront presentation, with the show returning as a fall series. Blake Shelton, Christina Aguilera, Adam Levine and CeeLo Green continued as coaches.

Season three introduce Steals during the Battle rounds in which other coaches can save a losing artist to join them to their team and reinstating them in the competition. It was initially enacted during the Battle rounds, but would later extended to Knockout rounds (also introduced this season) from season five onwards.

This is the first season to introduce a revamp of the competition during the live shows adapting to a format similar to The X Factor, where eliminations now apply to any artists disregarding to the team's affiliation, and the iTunes bonus multiplier where it was awarded a tenfold of votes (fivefold as of season five) to certain artists if their recorded single peaked at a certain position at the close of the voting window. This is also the first time in the show's history a reduced three artists represented in the finale, thus making it the first season not all of the coaches would guarantee to represent an artist in the finale. This is one of only four seasons where the team size was not 12, but with a size of 16 (The inaugural season was the first with a size of eight members; seasons 18 through 20 had 10 members instead of the traditional 12).

Cassadee Pope was announced as the winner of the season, making her the first female winner of The Voice. Pope's victory also marked Shelton's second win as a coach, and the first coach to win multiple (and consecutive) seasons.

Auditions, coaches, and hosts

Auditions for were held on July 7 to August 12, 2012 in Memphis, Minneapolis, New York, Dallas and Los Angeles.

All original coaches signed on for season three. Mary J. Blige, Michael Bublé, Rob Thomas, and Billie Joe Armstrong joined the show as advisers for Adam Levine, Blake Shelton, CeeLo Green, and Christina Aguilera's teams respectively during the Battle Rounds segment of the show. Christina, Blake, and Cee Lo brought in Ron Fair, Scott Hendricks, and Jennifer Hudson respectively to help coach in the episode, Top 10 Perform Live. Cee Lo brought in Bill Withers to coach Nicholas David the following week, and was sick during rehearsals for the subsequent week, so he brought in Pat Monahan, lead singer for Train, to coach all his artists that week, while still choosing his team members' songs and keeping in touch with them on the phone.

Teams
Color key

Blind auditions
Color key

Episode 1 (Sept. 10)
The coaches performed "Start Me Up" at the start of the show.

Episode 2 (Sept. 11)

Episode 3 (Sept. 12)

Episode 4 (Sept. 17)
A preview of Christina Aguilera's video for Your Body was televised.

Episode 5 (Sept. 18)

Episode 6 (Sept. 24)

Episode 7 (Sept. 25)

Episode 8 (Oct. 1)

Episode 9: The Best of the Blind Auditions (Oct. 2)
Episode 9 featured a clip show recapping some of the highlights of the blind auditions, along with the preview of the Battle rounds.

The Battles
The Battle Rounds were broadcast from Monday, October 8 to Tuesday, October 23. In a history first for The Voice, 'Steals' were introduced this season, where each coach could steal any two defeated artists from another team by pressing the button on their chairs; similar to the Blind Auditions, if the event multiple coaches decide to steal, the artist was given a choice to choose which team they want to join, and only the coach which was successfully joined counts as a "steal". The advisors for these episodes are: Mary J. Blige working with Adam Levine; Michael Bublé working with Blake Shelton; Rob Thomas (Matchbox Twenty) working with Cee Lo Green; and Billie Joe Armstrong (Green Day) working with Christina Aguilera.

Color key

The Knockouts
The Knockouts were broadcast from Monday, October 29 to Tuesday, October 30.

After the Battle Round, each coach had 10 contestants for the Knockouts. Each episode featured knockout battles consisting of pairings from within each team. The contestants were not told who they were up against until the day of the Knockout. Each contestant sang a song of their own choice, back to back, and each knockout concluded with the respective coach eliminating one of the two contestants; the five winners for each coach advanced to the live shows.

Color key

Live shows
Color key

Week 1: Live playoffs (November 5, 7 & 8)
The live playoffs were aired on November 5 and 7, followed by a results show on Thursday, November 8. No episode was aired on November 6 due to the coverage of the 2012 United States presidential election.

Performances were intentionally stripped down compared to previous seasons, so that there is greater focus on the voices of the artists. Special guests included Taylor Kinney from Chicago Fire in the audience.

Week 2: Top 12 (Nov 12 & 13)
The live top 12 performances were aired on November 12, followed by a results show on November 13.

From this point on in the competition, all remaining contestants performed live each week, and only the public's vote determined which contestants advanced in the competition. Unlike previous seasons, rather than each team eliminating equal numbers of contestants each week, third season (and later seasons) eliminations applied individually without regard to contestants' team affiliation (meaning that all artists competed head-to-head against all remaining contestants each week), introducing the possibility of a final without an equal team representation.

Additionally, producers made changes in the voting system with regards to iTunes singles purchases, announced during the results show. Previous voting via iTunes purchases of contestant performances had previously only counted singly during the official voting window and only accredited to the live show in concern. As of this week in the competition, if a competitor's performance stays within the Top 10 of the iTunes "Top 200 Single Chart" (updated hourly) until the close of voting, it will be awarded an iTunes bonus that multiplies iTunes votes made in the 24-hour voting window by ten. The finale's vote count will have include a 'Cumulative iTunes Vote Total' of all singles (from Top 12 onwards) purchased during and outside of the various voting windows, with iTunes bonus previously earned.

Week 3: Top 10 (Nov 19 & 20)
The live top 10 performances aired on November 19, followed by a results show on November 20.
Christina, Blake and Cee Lo brought in Ron Fair, Scott Hendricks and Jennifer Hudson respectively to help in this week's coaching. Other special guests included lead actors from the cast of Guys with Kids in the audience.

Cassadee Pope became the first-ever artist to be awarded the iTunes bonus as her singles hit #1 on iTunes Top 100 Singles chart.

Note

  Viewers voted between a performance of "Hit Me with Your Best Shot" by Team Blake & Team Christina, or "I Want You to Want Me" by Team Adam & Team Cee Lo via Twitter during the airing of the results show.

Week 4: Top 8 (Nov 26 & 27)
The live top 8 performances aired on November 26, followed by a results show on November 27. Cee Lo brought in Bill Withers, the original singer/songwriter of "Lean on Me" to help coach Nicholas David this week.

This week's iTunes bonus multipliers were awarded to Cassadee Pope (#2), Melanie Martinez (#3) and Nicholas David (#8).

Week 5: Top 6 (Dec 3 & 4)
The live top 6 performances aired on December 3, followed by a results show on December 4. Each contestant sang two songs, one of their choice, and one of the coach's choice. Coach Cee Lo was sick during rehearsals, so he brought in Pat Monahan, lead singer for Train, to coach his artists this week, while still choosing his team members' songs and keeping in touch with them on the phone.

This week's iTunes bonus were awarded for Terry McDermott (#2), Cassadee Pope (#3 & #7), Nicholas David (#4) and Trevin Hunte (#8).

With the eliminations of Melanie Martinez and Amanda Brown, Levine no longer has any artists remaining on his team.

Week 6: Semifinals (Dec 10 & 11)
The semifinal performances aired on December 10, followed by a results show on December 11. Special guests included Howie Mandel from Take It All and Of Monsters and Men, whose song "Little Talks" was covered in a non-competition performance, in the audience. Tony Lucca was also interviewed for a short while with his coach from last season, Adam Levine, in the Sprint Skybox.

This week's recipients for the iTunes bonus were Cassadee Pope (#1), Terry McDermott (#2) and Nicholas David (#4).

Week 7: Finale (Dec 17 & 18)
The final performances aired on December 17, followed by a results show on December 18. Each finalist would perform a reprise of a past performance, a duet with their coach, and a solo performance. Special guests included the cast of 1600 Penn and The Biggest Loser in the audience.

Three performances reached Top 10 on iTunes as follows Cassadee Pope (#1 & #6) and Terry McDermott (#5).

The live performance opens with all contestants and judges singing Leonard Cohen's Hallelujah holding up the names of the victims of the Sandy Hook Elementary School mass shooting 3 days prior to its airing.

  The performance was a tribute to the Newtown, Connecticut shooting victims, and placards displaying the names and ages of the victims were held by the performers.

Elimination chart

Overall
Color key
Artist's info

Result details

Team
Color key
Artist's info

Result details

Performances by guests/coaches

Artists appearances on other talent shows=
Daniel Rosa, Sam James, and Dez Duron sang in the blind auditions in season two and failed to make a team.
JR Aquino, Danny Hunter Jones, and Alessandra Guercio reached the Hollywood rounds of American Idol in seasons four, nine, and ten respectively, but did not reach the Top 24.
Liz Davis was the winner of P. Diddy's Starmaker
DOMO appeared on America's Best Dance Crew – season four as a member of Rhythm City.
Adanna Duru later became a finalist on the fourteenth season of "American Idol."
MacKenzie Bourg later made the Top 24 on the fifteenth season of American Idol and finished in fourth place.
Loren Allred would go on to provide the singing voice behind Rebecca Ferguson's character Jenny Lind in the 2017 movie The Greatest Showman, performing the song "Never Enough" which has since certified Gold in the United Kingdom and the United States, and has charted in several other countries. The reprise has since certified Silver in the UK. She has also featured on Hardwell's and KAAZE's "This Is Love". Loren is currently competing on Britain's Got Talent
Sam James would later go on Season 1 of Songland.
Cassadee Pope would later go on the Season 3 episode of Lip Sync Battle: "Dustin Lynch vs. Cassadee Pope". She also went on to have multiple Platinum singles and was nominated for a Grammy award. She also appeared on Name That Tune head-to-head with Jana Kramer.
 Melanie Martinez later went on to star in and direct her own film titled K-12 which is for her second album of the same name. She also went on to have a Platinum album and multiple Platinum singles.
 Odiseas Georgiadis auditioned again at Season 13, but failed to make a team again.
 Amanda Brown (singer) appeared in Season 21 to support her sister, Samara, in the Blind Auditions

Ratings
Season three premiered on September 10, 2012 and was watched by 12.28 million viewers with a 4.2 rating in the key 18–49 demographic. It was down 39 percent in the demo from last season's premiere. The Voice aired three times during its first week, going up against The X Factor on September 12, 2012. This show was highly criticised by Simon Cowell, who said that The X Factor would win in ratings. However, both The Voice and The X Factor tied on September 12, 2012, both with a 3.4 rating in the 18–49 demographic, but The Voice won in total viewers. In its regular time slot on Mondays and Tuesdays, The Voice airs opposite Dancing with the Stars.

References 
General

Specific

Season 03
2012 American television seasons